13 Gården is the sixth studio album by Swedish recording artist Titiyo. It was released on 16 October 2015 on Telegram Records and Warner Music Sweden, marking her first full-length album in seven years. Named after her childhood address in the Solna Municipality, outside of Stockholm, it was Titiyo's first album to be recorded entirely in Swedish language.

Track listing

Charts

References

External links
 Titiyo.com — official site

2015 albums
Titiyo albums
Swedish-language albums